Skagen Denmark is a brand, initially of watches, of Skagen Designs Ltd. (a subsidiary of Fossil), that has grown into being a wider American contemporary accessories brand based on Danish design. As of spring 2015, its product lines include watches, handbags, jewelry, and other durable personal goods, the majority of which aimed at the mid-range. Starting in New York, then in Lake Tahoe and Reno, Nevada, Skagen Designs Ltd. operations are overseen from Richardson, Texas, near Dallas, in the United States.

Company structure and locations
As of its acquisition by Fossil Inc. on April 2, 2012, Skagen Designs, Ltd. operates as a wholly owned subsidiary of Fossil, listing, as of May 1, 2015, Charlotte Jorst as co-founder and president, Henrik Jorst as co-founder, and Steen Albrechtslund as group managing director.

The company began in the home of its co-founders in New York, moving first to Lake Tahoe, then Reno, Nevada. Its current operations under Fossil are overseen from Richardson, Texas, near Dallas, in the United States. As of May 2015, the company is reported to have additional U.S. offices, as well as ones in Denmark and Hong Kong, and concept stores in Japan (Tokyo, Osaka, and Nagoya) and Taiwan (Taipei).

Aim and products
The title brand represents Fossil's subsidiary, Skagen Designs Ltd., which has as its stated corporate aim to "bring Danish-inspired ideals to the world through design imbued with purpose, honesty and simplicity." The company designs, manufactures and sells watches, handbags, jewelry and sunglasses for both men and women. Products are sold in shops and online. The company sells its products in the UK, the E.U., and the Middle East, and in India, Japan, Taiwan, Australia, Malaysia, Singapore and the US.

Company history

Founding
Founded in 1989, the company was the brainchild of Henrik and Charlotte Jorst, who had moved from Denmark to the US in 1986 when Henrik was appointed U.S. sales manager for Danish brewery Carlsberg. The couple decided to establish their own business as U.S. representative for a Danish manufacturer of corporate branded business gift watches, and for exclusive Jacob Jensen designer watches.

After locating the Danish-owned clock and watch manufacturer, Comtech Watches, a supplier that could manufacture watches at a lower price through its Hong Kong factory, the Jorsts began designing their own watches, which they showed at a corporate gift fair in New York 1991. At that fair, they were encouraged by several retailers to market the watches under their own brand, which they chose as Skagen Denmark, Skagen for the Danish fishing village (and peninsula) of that name. The company logo symbolizes the meeting of the Skagerrak and the Kattegat bodies of sea water at Skagen, Denmark's northernmost settlement and port, in Jutland.

Development

The following information, unless otherwise noted, is drawn from a case study description of Skagen Denmark, by Svend Hollensen, in Essentials of Global Marketing:
 1992 — Jorsts sell watches for first time under their own brand name achieving annual sales of US $800,000.
 1993 — Jorsts moves from New York to Nevada for tax and personal reasons, still running company without employees.
 1995 — New York department store Bloomingdale's agrees to trial period, selling their watches.
 1998 — Company lists as one of the 250 fastest-growing privately owned U.S. companies, opens European distribution office in Denmark, 80 stores in that country begin selling their watches, annual sales approaches .
 1999 — Employees approaches 100, distribution begins in the United Kingdom. 
 2000 — Distribution begins in Germany and the Netherlands.
 2002 — Company expands into more European countries and the Middle East, in effort extending into the following year.
 2007 — Company moves into the Asian markets, establishing an office in Hong Kong.
 2010 — Company opens online retail portals serving the U.S. and Europe.
 2011 — Asia-Pacific division launches online retail portals for Australia, Hong Kong, and Singapore markets.

Further reading
 Zacks Equity Research, 2012, "Fossil to Acquire Skagen," Yahoo! Finance (online), January 11, 2012, see , accessed 1 May 2015. Business description and summary from 2012 not yet fully extracted.

References

External links

 Skagen Denmark webpage for its Richardson, Texas headquarters and webstore.
 Skagen Designs, Ltd. company brochure, 2011.
 March 2009 company press release on Albrechtslund appointment, Asia market expansion.
 February 2010 company press release on opening of U.S. and European online retail stores.

Watch manufacturing companies of the United States
American brands
Danish design
Companies based in Dallas
Manufacturing companies of Denmark
Fossil Group